Rathnagiri Rahasya is a 1957 Indian Kannada-language adventure film, directed and produced by B. R. Panthulu, starring Udaykumar and Jamuna. The film was made simultaneously in Tamil as Thangamalai Ragasiyam, released in the same year, with Jamuna reprising her role. Most of the technical crew remained the same for both Tamil and Kannada versions.

Plot 

Udaykumar plays the role of a prince who is separated from his parents by his father's foe at a very young age. He grew up as a ferocious and vicious caveman. Then he meets Jamuna, who by her word of love and affection turns him for good. Both set out to find the secret of Rathnagiri to find and save Udaykumar's parents.

Cast 
 Udaykumar
 Jamuna
 Sowcar Janaki
 B. Saroja Devi as Yavvanamohini
 B. R. Panthulu
 M. V. Rajamma
 Balakrishna
 T. R. Ramachandran
 Dikki Madhava Rao
 C. H. Narayana Rao
 H. Krishna Shastry

Production 
Rathnagiri Rahasya is the directorial debut of B. R. Panthulu. It was simultaneously filmed in Tamil as Thangamalai Ragasiyam. Future acclaimed director Puttanna Kanagal made his debut as an assistant director in this film.

Soundtrack 
The soundtrack was composed by T. G. Lingappa.
 "Sharanara Kaayo" – Soolamangalam Rajalakshmi
 "Ananda Mahadaananda" – Jikki, Soolamangalam Rajalakshmi, K. Rani
 "Anuragadha Amaravathi" – T. M. Soundararajan, P. Leela
 "Amara Madhura Prema" – P. Susheela
 "O Raja O Maharaja" – A. P. Komala, K. Rani
 "Yavvanave Ee Yavvanave" – A. P. Komala, K. Rani
 "Kalyana Namma" – T. M. Soundararajan, P. Leela
 "Baa Baa Baa Odi Baa" – P. Leela, K. Rani
 "Sumabaana Bidu Mouna" – Jikki
 "Thaiy Thanthai Deva" – T. M. Soundararajan
 "Kivi Eradu Sakenayya" – Soolamangalam Rajalakshmi

References

External links 
 

1950s fantasy adventure films
1950s Kannada-language films
1950s multilingual films
1957 directorial debut films
1957 films
Films about cavemen
Films about princes
Films directed by B. R. Panthulu
Films scored by T. G. Lingappa
Films set in ancient India
Indian black-and-white films
Indian fantasy adventure films
Indian multilingual films